This list of films of The Church of Jesus Christ of Latter-day Saints (LDS Church) includes the non-commercial motion pictures commissioned by or officially produced by the church.  Such films were originally used in the homes or worship services of church members, or in visitors' centers on Temple Square or near one of the church's temples. Most church films were produced by LDS Motion Picture Studios. Since the opening of the Joseph Smith Memorial Building in downtown Salt Lake City, Utah in 1993, some feature-length films were premiered and exclusively shown in its Legacy Theatre, prior to release for broader use. In the 1970s, the church also commissioned Brigham Young University (BYU) to produce short films for use in the Church Educational System. These films, shown mostly in the seminaries and institutes of religion, teach religious principles, church history, and general kindness. Released on VHS (and increasingly on DVD), they became popular home entertainment. A wide variety of these films are now available through BYU's Creative Works Office.

These films differ from those of Mormon cinema, which are produced without official church involvement.

Feature films

Bible Videos 
In 2011, the LDS Church began producing a series of live-action adaptations of various stories, titled Bible Videos, which it distributed on its website and YouTube channel.

Book of Mormon Videos 
In 2019, the LDS Church began producing a series of live-action adaptations of various stories, titled Book of Mormon Videos, which it distributed on its website and YouTube channel.

References

Further reading

External links

 Brigham Young University's Creative Works Office
 New Video Honoring Scriptures Legacy Now on churchofjesuschrist.org
 
 Hard to Find Mormon Videos YouTube channel
 Book of Mormon Videos - produced by the Church of Jesus Christ of Latter-day Saints

 
Films
Church of Jesus Christ of Latter-day Saints
Mormon literature